Dongkeng is a town under the jurisdiction of Dongguan prefecture-level city in the Pearl River Delta region of Guangdong province, China; it is located to the east of Dongguan's urban core.

External links

Geography of Dongguan
Towns in Guangdong